Greg Freeman is a former American football quarterback who played three seasons in the Arena Football League (AFL) with the Denver Dynamite, New Orleans Night and Cleveland Thunderbolts. He played college football at Tiffin University.

College career
Freeman played for the Tiffin Dragons in their first seasons from 1985 to 1987. He recorded 305 completions on 4,075 passing yards. He was a two-time All-District 22 selection. Freeman also recorded 2,210 yards in a single season and 475 yards in a game.

Professional career
Freeman placed 12th out of 25 quarterbacks at the National Football League Combine in 1988. He played for the Denver Dynamite in 1991, recording three pass attempts. He played for the New Orleans Night of the AFL in 1992, recording nine touchdowns on 535 passing yards and one rushing touchdown. Freeman played for the Cleveland Thunderbolts of the AFL in 1993, recording one touchdown on 87 passing yards.

References

External links
Just Sports Stats

Living people
Year of birth missing (living people)
American football quarterbacks
Tiffin Dragons football players
Denver Dynamite (arena football) players
New Orleans Night players
Cleveland Thunderbolts players